Gaur Brahmins (spelling variations: Gor or Gour), also Gaud Brahmins, is a group of Brahmin communities in India. The Gauda Brahmins are one of the five Pancha Gauda Brahmin communities that lives in the north of the Vindhyas.

Gaur Brahmins likely originated from Kurukshetra region. Initially inhabiting tracts of land between the Yamuna and Sutlej rivers. Today they are most numerous in the western half of Northern India, particularly in the states of Haryana, Punjab, Rajasthan as well as in the western parts of Uttar Pradesh and Madhya Pradesh and a significant amount are present in other northern states of India as well.

The Gaurs claim that the other four main divisions of North Indian Brahmins were originally Gaur, and have acquired their present designations of  Saraswat Brahmins, Kanyakubja Brahmins, Maithil Brahmins and Utkala Brahmins by immigrating to the provinces where they are now domiciled. In Sir George Campbell's Ethnology of India, it is suggested that Gaurs may have derived their names from the  Ghaggar-Hakra River, which, in ancient times, was a tributary of Saraswati and now discharges its waters into the Sutlej near Firozpur.  Adi Gaurs practise agriculture and  their soil with their own hands and there is class class of Gaurs known as Taga Gaurs.

References

See also
Forward Castes
Gaur Muslims

Brahmin communities of Rajasthan
Brahmin communities of Madhya Pradesh
Brahmin communities of Haryana
Brahmin communities of Gujarat
Punjabi Brahmins